Fans Only is a rockumentary following the development of Belle & Sebastian during their time with Jeepster, from 'If You're Feeling Sinister’ to ‘Storytelling’. It features videos, live performances, interviews, out-takes, TV appearances, early documentary footage, exclusive material and behind the scenes insights into the evolution of the band.
The front cover features band member Stuart Murdoch's wife, Marisa Privitera.

Track listing
All songs written by Belle & Sebastian except where otherwise noted.

"Dog on Wheels"
"I Could Be Dreaming"
"A Century of Fakers"
"Like Dylan in the Movies"
"Lazy Line Painter Jane"
"Is It Wicked Not to Care?"
"The Boy with the Arab Strap"
"Poupée de cire, poupée de son" (Serge Gainsbourg)
"This Is Just a Modern Rock Song"
"Legal Man"
"The Wrong Girl"
"Wandering Alone"
"Jonathan David"
"I'm Waking Up to Us"
"The State I Am In"

Belle and Sebastian video albums
2003 video albums
2003 compilation albums
2003 live albums
Live video albums
Music video compilation albums
Jeepster Records live albums
Jeepster Records compilation albums
Jeepster Records video albums